Efraín Velarde Calvillo (born 18 April 1986), also known as Chispa, is a Mexican professional footballer who plays as a left-back.

Velarde joined the Pumas youth system at the age of 13 and worked his way through the ranks to debut in 2004; he usually plays in the left flank of the defense.

Pumas UNAM 
Emerged from the Pumas quarry where he entered at the age of 13. He debuted in the First Division with the UNAM team on 15 May 2004 in the UNAM-3 Monterrey-2 match, (wearing number 75 on his shirt) scoring a goal with his head in the last minutes, giving him the victory. to the Pumas, with Hugo Sánchez as coach. With the feline team he won four league titles and became a benchmark behind UNAM.

Monterrey 
Efraín 'Chispa' Velarde, was transferred from Pumas to Rayados de Monterrey in definitive purchase, in the annual Draft of the Bancomer MX League, where he would play the Apertura 2014 and Clausura 2015 tournaments.

Club Leon 
On 11 June 2015, Velarde is transferred on loan to Club León, lasting only three tournaments in the Leon team. It was the third shirt that the former university player defended.

Toluca 
On 14 December 2016, it is announced that he will be a new player for Deportivo Toluca.

Return to Monterrey from Loan 
On 26 December 2017, his arrival at the club is confirmed, to be a reinforcement for the Clausura Tournament 2018 (Mexico), El "Chispa" returns to the institution since his last time in 2015.

Return to Pumas UNAM 
On 9 June 2021, Chispa' Velarde was once again made official as a Pumas player from Mazatlán F.C. this time (wearing number 18 on his shirt)

Personal life 
In August 2011, Velarde married his girlfriend of 6 years, Jessica Gómez Espinosa, in a mansion in Mexico City. The couple has two children, Sofía, born in Mexico City on 20 August 2010, and Santino, born on 12 November 2012 in the capital.

International career
On 4 September 2011, Velarde was called up to the senior national team by coach José Manuel de la Torre for a friendly in Barcelona Spain against Chile making it his first international appearance.

Career statistics

International Cups

International

Participation in the Copa Oro of Concacaf

Participation in Copa America

Honours
UNAM
Mexican Primera División: Clausura 2004, Apertura 2004, Clausura 2009, Clausura 2011
Campeón de Campeones: 2004

Individual
Mexican Primera División Best Full-back of the tournament: Clausura 2011

References

External links

1986 births
Living people
Footballers from Mexico City
Association football defenders
Liga MX players
Club Universidad Nacional footballers
C.F. Monterrey players
Club León footballers
Deportivo Toluca F.C. players
Mexico international footballers
2013 CONCACAF Gold Cup players
2015 Copa América players
Mexican footballers